Richard Engle may refer to:

Rick Engle (born 1957), Major League Baseball pitcher
Richard B. Engle, founder of Engle Aircraft Corp,; see List of aircraft (E)

See also
Richard Engel (disambiguation)